Hirisave is a village in the Hassan district of the state of Karnataka, India. It is near the Jain pilgrimage centre of Shravanabelagola. It lies on the National Highway which connects Bangalore and Mangalore. 
Most of the population speaks Kannada and the major income source is from Agriculture. 
This is the Junction to Shravanabelagula from Bangalore to Mangalore Highway(NH75). The main tourist attraction is Hirisave Chowdeswary temple.

Villages in Hassan district